St Bede's Church may refer to:

 St Bede's Church, Rotherham, South Yorkshire
 St Bede's Church, Widnes, Cheshire
 St Bede's Church, Toxteth Park, Liverpool

See also
 Bede